The 1970–71 Soviet Championship League season was the 25th season of the Soviet Championship League, the top level of ice hockey in the Soviet Union. Nine teams participated in the league, and CSKA Moscow won the championship.

Standings

External links
Season on hockeystars.ru

1970–71 in Soviet ice hockey
Soviet
Soviet League seasons